Ljusnan is a forest river in Northern Värmland, Sweden. The river spring is near the Norwegian border. It has a total length of 430 km (270 mi).

References

Rivers of Värmland County